James Browne (born June 15, 1966) is a retired long jumper, who finished in 17th position at the 1988 Summer Olympics in Seoul, South Korea, as a representative of Antigua and Barbuda.

He attended Abilene Christian University in Texas where he was a member of the Abilene Christian Wildcats.

References

Profile

1966 births
Athletes (track and field) at the 1988 Summer Olympics
Olympic athletes of Antigua and Barbuda
Antigua and Barbuda male triple jumpers
Antigua and Barbuda male long jumpers
Abilene Christian University alumni
Living people